Thomas Flemming (born 14 July 1967, in Bad Schlema) is a former freestyle swimmer from East Germany, who competed for his native country at the 1988 Summer Olympics.

There he won the silver medal in the 4×200 m freestyle, alongside Uwe Dassler, Sven Lodziewski, and Steffen Zesner. Flemming also won the bronze medal in the 4×100 m freestyle, together with Steffen Zesner, Lars Hinneburg, and Dirk Richter.

References

 databaseOlympics.com

1967 births
Living people
German male swimmers
Olympic swimmers of East Germany
Swimmers at the 1988 Summer Olympics
Olympic bronze medalists in swimming
German male freestyle swimmers
World Aquatics Championships medalists in swimming
European Aquatics Championships medalists in swimming
Medalists at the 1988 Summer Olympics
Olympic silver medalists for East Germany
Olympic bronze medalists for East Germany
Olympic silver medalists in swimming